Harry Cook (born 12 June 1991) is a British-Australian actor and writer. Born in Croydon, South London, Cook moved to Australia with his family in 2001 (when aged 10). Cook is best known for his roles in Accidents Happen (2009), Caught Inside and Drown (film). Other roles also include Chook in Panic at Rock Island (2010), Drew Johnston in I Love You Both (2015) and Tom Muller in My Place (TV Series). His role  in Drown earned him a Best Supporting Actor Award at FilmOut San Diego Film Festival in 2015.

Cook came out as gay in 2013. He was on the forefront of the fight for marriage equality in Australia. In 2016, Cook was nominated as LGBTQ Celebrity of the Year at the Inaugural Australian LGBTQ Awards held at the Sydney Opera House for his work as an openly gay activist and actor. He was nominated again the following year. Cook was nominated again for the LGBTI Local Icon Award at the 2019 Australian LGBTI Awards.

In September 2018, Cook's debut memoir Pink Ink (book) was released to rave reviews.
His debut young adult novel, 'Fin & Rye & Fireflies', was released worldwide in August 2020 through Black and White Publishing's imprint Ink Road Books as their first LGBTQI+ themed YA novel to rave reviews.
In 2021, Harry released his second YA novel, 'Felix Silver, Teaspoons & Witches' via Duet/Interlude press.

Filmography

Film

TV series

Theatre

Books

References

Australian gay actors
Australian LGBT rights activists
Australian male film actors
1991 births
Living people
21st-century Australian male actors